Gunpowder is a British historical drama television miniseries produced by Kudos and Kit Harington’s Thriker Films for BBC One. The three-part drama series premiered on BBC One in the United Kingdom on 21 October 2017 and on HBO in the United States on 18 December 2017.

The series was developed by Ronan Bennett, Kit Harington, and Daniel West and is based on the Gunpowder Plot in London in 1605. It stars Harington, who is a direct descendant of his character Robert Catesby. J Blakeson directed the series.

Cast

Main
Kit Harington as Robert Catesby
Peter Mullan as Henry Garnet
Mark Gatiss as Robert Cecil, 1st Earl of Salisbury
Liv Tyler as Anne Vaux

Recurring
Luke Broughton as Thomas Bates 
Philip Hill-Pearson as Sir Everard Digby
Tom Cullen as Guy Fawkes
Daniel West as Thomas Percy
Joseph Ringwood as Ambrose Rookwood
Martin Lindley as Francis Tresham
Christopher T Johnson as Robert Wintour
Edward Holcroft as Thomas Wintour
Matthew Neal as Christopher Wright
Luke Neal as John Wright
Shaun Dooley as Sir William Wade
Derek Riddell as James I
Robert Emms as Father John Gerard
Thom Ashley as Father Daniel Smith
Sian Webber as Lady Dorothy Dibdale
Pedro Casablanc as The Constable of Castile
Andy Lucas as Juan de Tassis, 1st Count of Villamediana
David Bamber as Henry Percy, 9th Earl of Northumberland
Simon Kunz as Thomas Howard, 1st Earl of Suffolk
Hugh Alexander as Philip Herbert, 4th Earl of Pembroke
Sean Rigby as William Parker, 4th Baron Monteagle
Robert Gwyllim as Sir William Stanley
Andrew Jarvis as Edward Alford

Production
In February 2017, the BBC ordered Gunpowder, then announced the three-part drama series was to be developed by Ronan Bennett, Kit Harington, and Daniel West; written by Ronan Bennett; and produced by Kudos. The series stars Kit Harington, Peter Mullan, Mark Gatiss, and Liv Tyler, and is directed by J Blakeson. Filming started in late February 2017.

Filming locations included the National Trust's East Riddlesden Hall and Fountains Abbey, alongside popular visitor attractions such as Oakwell Hall; Ripley Castle; Haddon Hall; Kirkstall Abbey; Bolton Abbey; Lendal Bridge in York City Centre; and the famous Ilkley Moor. Beverley Minster depicted the regal splendour of the Palace of Westminster.

Episodes 
All three episodes were available on the BBC iPlayer following the terrestrial broadcast of the first episode.

Broadcast
Gunpowder premiered on BBC One in the United Kingdom on 21 October 2017.
The series premiered in the United States on HBO on 18 December 2017.

Reception
On the review aggregator Rotten Tomatoes, the series has an approval rating of 72% based on 25 reviews, with an average rating of 7.25/10. On Metacritic, which assigns a normalised rating, the series has a score 63 out of 100, based on 10 critics, indicating "generally favourable reviews".

The initial reaction to the first episode was mired with complaints from viewers about the depicted scenes of torture, nudity, and disembowelment despite the broadcast time being 10 minutes after the watershed of 9pm. In response to complaints, the BBC said: "The scenes aired after 9.30pm with a clear warning given to viewers before the episode started. The methods depicted are grounded in historical fact and reflect what took place during the time of the Gunpowder Plot." It was described as 'a very good drama' by other viewers.

See also
Gunpowder, Treason & Plot

References

External links
 
 
  
 
 
 

2017 British television series debuts
2017 British television series endings
2010s British drama television series
2010s British television miniseries
BBC television dramas
English-language television shows
Television series by Endemol
Television series set in the 17th century
Television shows set in West Yorkshire
Terrorism in television
Gunpowder Plot
BBC television miniseries
Fiction set in 1605
Cultural depictions of Guy Fawkes
Cultural depictions of James VI and I